Kim Jun-ho (born December 25, 1975), also known as Charlie Kim, is a South Korean comedian, singer and television personality. He has starred in Gag Concert since 1999 and was a member of the variety show 2 Days & 1 Night from 2013 to 2019. He has also been the executive chairman of Busan International Comedy Festival since its conception in 2013.

Considered one of the best comedians in South Korea, Kim  has won two Top Excellence awards and a Daesang Award at the KBS Entertainment Awards in both comedy and variety divisions.

Biography 
Kim was born in Daejeon, South Korea. His sister, Kim Mi-jin, is a TV show host He graduated from Chungnam High School  and was majoring in acting at Dankook University before dropping out.

Kim is greatly influenced by the famous comedian, Charlie Chaplin. For this reason he chose "Charlie Kim" as his English name.

Personal life 
On March 2, 2006, Kim married musical actress Kim Eun-young. The couple lived separately since 2007 after Kim Eun-young moved to the Philippines alone to start a business. On January 22, 2018, the comedian announced his divorce with his wife after 12 years of marriage.

On April 3, 2022, it was confirmed that Kim is in a relationship with comedian Kim Ji-min.

Career 
Kim originally debuted under SBS's 5th class of comedians. He later joined KBS's Gag Concert in 1999 and is part of its 14th class. He was also a cast member for the first season of The Human Condition. He joined the 2 Days & 1 Night Season 3 lineup with Kim Joohyuk, Defconn and Jung Joon Young at the very end of 2013, gaining popularity as well as earning the nickname of "Mr. Devious" for his tendency to trick the other cast members. Kim is the chairman and head of the organizing committee for the Busan International Comedy Festival. He is a member of 같기도 (Gatgido), a comedic trio, which released an album with the same name in 2007.

Kim was the co-CEO and founder of CoKo Entertainment. However, in late 2014, it was discovered that his partner and co-CEO, Kim Woo Jung, had embezzled money from the company and had run away to the United States, causing the company debts to reach over millions of dollars. When it shut down from bankruptcy in January 2015, he and former comedians under CoKo company transferred to JD Bros, a company that is run by his friend, Kim Dae Hui. The comedians also cited that they will continue to support Kim Junho despite the incident.

Filmography

Film 
 Ungnami (TBA) – (special appearance)
 Come Back Home (2022) – (Special appearance) 
 Enemies In-Law | Kim Jin-young (2015) – MC (cameo)
 The Gifted Hands | Saikometeuri (2013) – marketing evangelist (cameo)
 Ice Age 4 | Steve Martino (2012) – Korean dubbed, voice for Flynn
 Whatcha Wearin'? | Naui P.S. Pateuneo (2012) – restaurant waiter (cameo)
 Love Clinique | Umchi Keulreonik (2012) – subway man (cameo)

TV movie 
 Night Watch | Boolchimbuneul Seora (KBS2 / 2013) – Soo-Ji's ex-husband

Television series 
 Hit the Top | (KBS2 / 2017) as Passenger / Doctor
 Late Night Cafeteria | (SBS / 2015)
 Personal Taste | (MBC / 2010)
 Night after Night |  (MBC / 2008) as Lee Sang-Ho
 New Heart | (MBC / 2007–2008) as Sul Rae-Hyun
 Air City | (MBC / 2007) as No Tae-Man
 Sweet Spy | (MBC / 2005–2006) as Ka Oh-Ri

Television show 
 KBS Human Condition
 KBS Qualifications of Men
 KBS 퀴즈쇼 사총사 (Quiz 4 Men)
 KBS Secret
 KBS The Gag Concert You've Never Seen Before
 KBS Happy Together
 KBS Joy Hug Me
 tvN Sense King
 ComedyTV 기막힌외출 (S1-S6)
 KBS 2 Days 1 Night
 SBS Reckless but Happy
 TV Chosun 한집살림
 tvN Seoulmate 2
 tvN Seoulmate 3 (Ep 10 - 12)
 tvN Wednesday Music Playlist
 MBN 
 tvN Salty Tour
 SBS My Little Old Boy (Special casts , 213–present)
 MBN With Rumors 
  tvN D Star Golf Big League 
 SBS Dolsing Fourmen (Host, 2021)
 KBS2 Winner(s) (2021)
 Genius Jigol (2021)
 Golf Battle: Birdie Buddies 4 ; Contestant

Web shows 
  Golf Eve -female golf team leader (2021) 
 Collaborum Scene 2 - Host; (2022)

Gag Concert segments 

1999–2006
Scream (1999)
Morning of Savana (1999)
Bongsunga School (2001)
The Three Idiots (2002)
What If (2002)
Zigzag Song (2002)
9시 언저리 뉴스 (2003)
Annals of X-Files (2004)
어우야 (2004)
Low Life (2005)
World News (2005)
Home (2006)
Zoo (2006)
Uncle Jun Ho (2006)
호구와 울봉이 (2006)
고교천왕 (2006)

2007–2012
같기도 (2007)
지누주노 (2007)
Gag Warrior 300 (2007)
Odd Family (2007)
날아라! 변튜어디스 (2008)
뜬금개그 (2008)
가문이 영~꽝 (2008)
Mobilize! Team Leader Kim (2008)
Malicious Virus (2008)
A Bitter Life (2009)
꽁트의 신 (2010)
Bait (2010)
Joa Family (2010)
Mr. Kim Bong Tu (2010)
Castle Gamsu (2011)
Emergency Meeting (2011)
Talk Show: The Dream (2012)
Snap Martial Arts (2012)

2013–present 
The Animals (2013)
Don't Give In (2013)
Zombie Project (2013)
Comedians' World (2013)
Hidden Characters (2013)
BBOOM Entertainment(2013)
Rules of the Workplace (2013)
Chicken High School (2014)
Meditation (2015)
Serious Kingdom (2015)
Welcome Back Show (2016)
Like A Family (2016)
YOLO Inn (2017)
Inner Voices (2017)
Eunuchs (2018)

Music videos 
 Unnies — Shut Up
 Mamamoo — Aze Gag

Discography 
 2007 같기도 (as part of Gatgido)
 2011 Happy Singer Project
 2013 The Zombie (Single)
 2017 Good Zombie

As featuring artist 
 Mamamoo — Aze Gag (narration by Kim Joon-ho and )

Awards and nominations
 2005 KBS Entertainment Awards: Top Excellence Award (Comedian)
 2009 36th Korea Broadcasting Grand Comedian Award
 2010 11th Republic of Korea Entertainment Visual Arts Division: Photogenic Award
 2011 18th Republic of Korea Entertainment Arts: Comedian Award
 2011 KBS Entertainment Awards: Top Excellence Award (Comedian)
 2013 25th Korea PD Awards: Comedian Grand Award
 2013 Ministry Appreciation Award
 2013 Cable TV Broadcasting: TV Star Award
 2013 KBS Entertainment Awards: Daesang Grand Prize Award
 2016 3rd Korean Comedy Hot Festival: Shining Comedians in 2016 (Individual Category)
 2018 KBS Entertainment Awards: Best Couple Award with Kim Jong-min
 2021 SBS Entertainment Awards  – Grand Prize (Daesang) (with My Little Old Boy team)
 2021 SBS Entertainment Awards  – Excellence Award in Talk/ Variety Category  - My Little Old Boy, Dolsing Fourmen
 2022 SBS Entertainment Awards – Top Excellence in Talk and Reality Award - My Little Old Boy, Dolsing Fourmen  
 2022 SBS Entertainment Awards – 2022 SBS's Daughter and Son - My Little Old Boy, Dolsing Fourmen

Ambassadorial roles 
 2012 Korea Forest Service
 2012 Tour de Korea

Footnotes

References

External links
 Kim Junho Profile on Daum
 Kim Jun Ho on Instagram

1975 births
Living people
South Korean male comedians
South Korean male television actors
Gag Concert
Gim clan of Gyeongju
South Korean YouTubers